Lars Salem Al Fakir (born 27 October 1981) is a Swedish musician, singer, songwriter and record producer. He regularly collaborates with Vincent Pontare as the songwriting and production duo Vargas and Lagola. Together, they have worked with many artists, including Avicii, Axwell & Ingrosso, Madonna, Seinabo Sey and Lady Gaga. In addition to his songwriting and production work, he releases alternative pop music as Vargas & Lagola.

Biography

Early life and artist career
Al Fakir learned to play violin at the age of four and subsequently toured Russia as a solo violinist at the age of fourteen, but returned to Sweden to study jazz piano. As a student he attended the Adolf Fredrik's Music School in Stockholm.

In the autumn of 2006, Al Fakir released his first EP Dream Girl. He is most famous for his chart topping albums This Is Who I Am (2007), Astronaut (2009) and Ignore This (2010). At the Swedish Grammy Awards in 2008 he won big – taking home four awards and being nominated in seven categories.

He took part in Melodifestivalen 2010, the Swedish national selection for the Eurovision Song Contest 2010, with "Keep On Walking" and finished in second place.

2010–present: Songwriting
After his solo career, Al Fakir became more focused on the songwriting. Beginning to collaborate with Avicii on "Silhouettes" in 2012. Among the first co-writes with Vincent Pontare are Avicii's 2013 Billboard Hot 100 single "Hey Brother" and "Younger" by Seinabo Sey.

At the 2014 Swedish Grammy Awards, Al Fakir, Vincent Pontare and Magnus Lidehäll were awarded Composer of the Year after writing for Veronica Maggio's album Handen i fickan fast jag bryr mig and the Petter album Början på allt, and work with artists like Galantis. In 2014 he wrote numerous songs on Mapei's album Hey Hey and Avicii's "The Days" and "Divine Sorrow" (with Wyclef Jean).
Al Fakir followed up with another successful year in 2015 co-writing most songs on Seinabo Sey's highly acclaimed debut album Pretend and songs for Madonna's Rebel Heart album.

Vargas & Lagola have co-written some of the biggest hits by Axwell Ʌ Ingrosso – "More Than You Know", "Sun Is Shining", "Dreamer" and more - taken from their 2017 album More Than You Know.

The duo have also contributed to two songs on Swedish rock band Ghost's Billboard 200-charting and Grammy Award-nominated album Prequelle, including the album's second single "Dance Macabre" which topped Billboard's Mainstream Rock Chart.

In 2018, the same moment as Vargas & Lagola blazed onto the alternative pop scene with the hit single "Roads", they shared the no.1 spot as Sweden's most streamed songwriters for songs including Avicii – "Without You (feat. Sandro Cavazza)" and "Waiting For Love". 
After working closely with Avicii for several years, Al Fakir and Pontare played a key role in finishing up the 2019 posthumous Avicii album TIM and are featured artists on three of the album songs. On 5 December 2019, Vargas & Lagola performed at Avicii's Tribute Concert in Stockholm.

Vargas & Lagola's debut album The Butterfly Effect was released in January 2020.

Discography

As Vargas & Lagola

As solo artist

Albums

Singles

Uncredited vocal work

Songwriting and production credits

Songwriting and production credits for local Swedish artists

Awards and nominations

References

External links 

 
 Planet Salem: the international Salem Al Fakir fansite

1981 births
Living people
English-language singers from Sweden
Swedish people of Syrian descent
21st-century Swedish singers
21st-century Swedish male singers
Male singer-songwriters
Musicians from Stockholm
Singers from Stockholm
Sommar (radio program) hosts
Swedish pop singers
Swedish singer-songwriters
Swedish songwriters
Melodifestivalen contestants of 2010